The Cavalcade Of Golf was a PGA Tour event that was played at the Shackamaxon Country Club in Scotch Plains, New Jersey. It was played for only a single year – 1955.

The tournament was won by Cary Middlecoff by two strokes over Sam Snead. It was Middlecoff's sixth and last victory of a career year that also included wins at the Masters and Western Open.

The purse was the richest ever offered at the time for a PGA Tour event held east of Chicago, and the second largest purse the pros would play for that year. The purse was $50,000 with $10,000 as the winner's share.

The course was designed by A. W. Tillinghast and opened in September 1916.

Winner
 1955 Cary Middlecoff

References

Former PGA Tour events
Golf in New Jersey